De with breve (Д̆ д̆; italics: Д̆ д̆) is a letter of the Cyrillic script. Its form is derived from the Cyrillic De (Д д) by adding a breve.

De with breve is used in the Aleut language (Bering dialect), where it represents the voiced dental fricative /ð/, like the pronunciation of ⟨th⟩ in English “they” . For example, ‘ад̆аӽ’  – father, ‘чӣд̆аӽ’  – baby bird.

References

See also
 Cyrillic characters in Unicode

Cyrillic letters with diacritics
Letters with breve